The 2017 Caribbean Premier League (CPLT20) or for sponsorship reasons, Hero CPL 2017 was the fifth season of the Caribbean Premier League, the domestic Twenty20 cricket league in the West Indies. Matches were played in seven countries – Trinidad and Tobago, Saint Kitts and Nevis, Guyana, Barbados, Jamaica, Saint Lucia, with four of the first five matches to be played Lauderhill, Florida, United States.

Squads

Points table

 Top four teams will advance to the Playoffs
  advanced to the Qualifier 1
  advanced to the Qualifier 2

Group stage
All times are local time

Playoffs

Qualifier 1

Eliminator

Qualifier 2

Final

Statistics

Most runs

 Last Update: 7 September 2017.

 Source: Cricinfo

Most wickets

 Last Update: 9 September 2017.
  The player with the most wickets at the end of the tournament receives the Purple Cap.
 Source: Cricinfo

References

External links
 Official web site
 Series home on ESPNCricinfo

Caribbean Premier League
Caribbean Premier League
Caribbean Premier League
2017 in Caribbean sport